First announced in August 2012, the Volvo B5RLEH, also known as Volvo B5RH and Volvo B215RH, is a hybrid-electric single-decker bus chassis manufactured by Volvo since 2013, initially only available in the Asia-Pacific region.

There is also a B215RH model for Latin America, manufactured by Volvo in Brazil, available as both low- and high-floor chassis.

Operators
In January 2013, Australian operator Transperth took delivery of a Volgren bodied B5RLEH for use on its Perth Central Area Transit network.

In January 2014, a second Volgren bodied Volvo B5RLEH commenced a 12-month trial with Adelaide operator Torrens Transit.

In March 2015, a third Volgren bodied Volvo B5RLEH commenced a 6-month trial with Singapore operator SBS Transit. It debuted on Express 506 from 1 March 2015 and later operated on services 185 and 143 till 10 September 2015. On 11 February 2016, an additional six month-trial was permitted and the bus was redeployed to the Ang Mo Kio Depot for operations on services 268 and 13. At the end of the trial period, the bus was deregistered and returned to Australia, where it was operated by CDC Melbourne until March 2019.

In April 2015, the first Volgren Optimus bodied Volvo B5RLEH commenced a trial with Brisbane operator Brisbane Transport.

Between June 2017 and December 2018, Transport Canberra, the sole government bus operator in the Australian Capital Territory, leased a demonstrator Volvo B5RLEH with a Bustech VSTH body as part of the territory's electric bus trial. It was registered as BUS-712, and was wrapped in a special livery before starting service, as it arrived in the standard Transport for NSW livery. It ran alongside two BYD Toro electric buses as part of this trial.

In June 2019 Hunter Valley based transport operator Port Stephens Coaches begun using two Volvo B5RLEH bodied Bustech VST buses for use on student university shuttles between UON's Newcastle campus and Callaghan campus. one bus wears a special modified TransportNSW livery covered in plant decals while the other is covered in all over advertising (AOA) promoting Volvo's Hybrid bus.

Engines

D5F, in-line 4 cyl. turbodiesel (2013–present)
 D5F215 - , 800 Nm, Euro 5/EEV

References

External links

Introduction Volvo Buses Australia

Vehicles introduced in 2013
B05RLEH
Hybrid electric buses
Low-entry buses
Single-deck buses
Bus chassis